Sabine Island is an uninhabited island located in Nunavut's Qikiqtaaluk Region within the northern Canadian Arctic. It is in eastern Gulf of Boothia's Committee Bay, south of Wales Island and west of the mainland's Melville Peninsula.

References

Islands of the Gulf of Boothia
Uninhabited islands of Qikiqtaaluk Region